Swift Current is a provincial electoral district for the Legislative Assembly of Saskatchewan, Canada. Located in southwestern Saskatchewan, it was created for the 2nd Saskatchewan general election in 1908.

Two Saskatchewan premiers have been elected from this constituency – Thomas Walter Scott, the first premier of the province; and Brad Wall, the 14th premier.

Members of the Legislative Assembly

Election results (1908–present) 

|-

 
|NDP
|Aaron Ens
|align="right"|1,223
|align="right"|16.45
|align="right"|-6.95

|-

 
|NDP
|Robert Hale
|align="right"|1,983
|align="right"|23.40 
|align="right"|-13.24

|-

 
|NDP
|Dean Smith
|align="right"|2,707
|align="right"|36.64

|-

 
|NDP
|John Wall
|align="right"|2,538
|align="right"|30.19%
|align="right"|-12.53

|- bgcolor="white"
!align="left" colspan=3|Total
!align="right"|8,407
!align="right"|100.00%
!align="right"|

|-
 
| style="width: 130px" |NDP
|John Wall
|align="right"|3,515
|align="right"|42.72%
|align="right"|-8.24
 
|Progressive Conservative
|Allan Bridal
|align="right"|2,576
|align="right"|31.31%
|align="right"|-0.32

|- bgcolor="white"
!align="left" colspan=3|Total
!align="right"|8,228
!align="right"|100.00%
!align="right"|

|-
 
| style="width: 130px" |NDP
|John Penner
|align="right"|4,399
|align="right"|50.96%
|align="right"|+7.77
 
|Progressive Conservative
|Lawrence Bergreen
|align="right"|2,731
|align="right"|31.63%
|align="right"|-19.08

|- bgcolor="white"
!align="left" colspan=3|Total
!align="right"|8,633
!align="right"|100.00%
!align="right"|

|-
 
| style="width: 130px" |Progressive Conservative
|Patricia Anne Smith
|align="right"|4,444
|align="right"|50.71%
|align="right"|-3.34
 
|NDP
|John Penner
|align="right"|3,785
|align="right"|43.19%
|align="right"|+9.77

|- bgcolor="white"
!align="left" colspan=3|Total
!align="right"|8,764
!align="right"|100.00%
!align="right"|

|-
 
| style="width: 130px" |Progressive Conservative
|Patricia Anne Smith
|align="right"|4,756
|align="right"|54.05%
|align="right"|+7.90
 
|NDP
|Spencer Wooff
|align="right"|2,941
|align="right"|33.42%
|align="right"|-8.50

|- bgcolor="white"
!align="left" colspan=3|Total
!align="right"|8,800
!align="right"|100.00%
!align="right"|

|-
 
| style="width: 130px" |Progressive Conservative
|Dennis Ham
|align="right"|3,620
|align="right"|46.15%
|align="right"|+0.66
 
|NDP
|Spencer Wooff
|align="right"|3,288
|align="right"|41.92%
|align="right"|+9.99

|- bgcolor="white"
!align="left" colspan=3|Total
!align="right"|7,844
!align="right"|100.00%
!align="right"|

|-
 
| style="width: 130px" |Progressive Conservative
|Dennis Ham
|align="right"|3,494
|align="right"|45.49%
|align="right"|-
 
|NDP
|Murray Walter
|align="right"|2,452
|align="right"|31.93%
|align="right"|-27.45

|- bgcolor="white"
!align="left" colspan=3|Total
!align="right"|7,680
!align="right"|100.00%
!align="right"|

|-
 
| style="width: 130px" |NDP
|Everett Wood
|align="right"|6,423
|align="right"|59.38%
|align="right"|+9.28

|- bgcolor="white"
!align="left" colspan=3|Total
!align="right"|10,817
!align="right"|100.00%
!align="right"|

|-
 
| style="width: 130px" |NDP
|Everett Wood
|align="right"|4,825
|align="right"|50.10%
|align="right"|-2.89

 
|Progressive Conservative
|Donald McGowan
|align="right"|1,439
|align="right"|14.95%
|align="right"|-
|- bgcolor="white"
!align="left" colspan=3|Total
!align="right"|9,630
!align="right"|100.00%
!align="right"|

|-
 
| style="width: 130px" |CCF
|Everett Wood
|align="right"|5,238
|align="right"|52.99%
|align="right"|+8.22

|- bgcolor="white"
!align="left" colspan=3|Total
!align="right"|9,885
!align="right"|100.00%
!align="right"|

|-
 
| style="width: 130px" |CCF
|Everett Wood
|align="right"|4,292
|align="right"|44.77%
|align="right"|+1.53

 
|Progressive Conservative
|Thomas Garland
|align="right"|1,683
|align="right"|17.56%
|align="right"|-

|- bgcolor="white"
!align="left" colspan=3|Total
!align="right"|9,586
!align="right"|100.00%
!align="right"|

|-
 
| style="width: 130px" |CCF
|Everett Wood
|align="right"|4,593
|align="right"|43.24%
|align="right"|-10.38

|- bgcolor="white"
!align="left" colspan=3|Total
!align="right"|10,622
!align="right"|100.00%
!align="right"|

|-
 
| style="width: 130px" |CCF
|Harry Gibbs
|align="right"|5,171
|align="right"|53.62%
|align="right"|+2.74

|- bgcolor="white"
!align="left" colspan=3|Total
!align="right"|9,643
!align="right"|100.00%
!align="right"|

|-
 
| style="width: 130px" |CCF
|Harry Gibbs
|align="right"|5,273
|align="right"|50.88%
|align="right"|-2.56

|- bgcolor="white"
!align="left" colspan=3|Total
!align="right"|10,364
!align="right"|100.00%
!align="right"|

|-
 
| style="width: 130px" |CCF
|Harry Gibbs
|align="right"|4,756
|align="right"|53.44%
|align="right"|+16.24

 
|Progressive Conservative
|Bryan M. Hill
|align="right"|1,021
|align="right"|11.47%
|align="right"|-
|- bgcolor="white"
!align="left" colspan=3|Total
!align="right"|8,900
!align="right"|100.00%
!align="right"|

|-

 
|CCF
|Clarence Stork
|align="right"|3,584
|align="right"|37.20%
|align="right"|+4.75

|- bgcolor="white"
!align="left" colspan=3|Total
!align="right"|9,634
!align="right"|100.00%
!align="right"|

|-

|Farmer-Labour
|Allan McCallum
|align="right"|2,339
|align="right"|32.45%
|align="right"|-
 
|Conservative
|William Wensley Smith
|align="right"|2,337
|align="right"|32.43%
|align="right"|-18.83
|- bgcolor="white"
!align="left" colspan=3|Total
!align="right"|7,207
!align="right"|100.00%
!align="right"|

|-
 
| style="width: 130px" |Conservative
|William Wensley Smith
|align="right"|2,851
|align="right"|51.26%
|align="right"|+9.83

|- bgcolor="white"
!align="left" colspan=3|Total
!align="right"|5,562
!align="right"|100.00%
!align="right"|

|-

 
|Conservative
|Thomas Graham
|align="right"|1,317
|align="right"|41.43%
|align="right"|-
|- bgcolor="white"
!align="left" colspan=3|Total
!align="right"|3,179
!align="right"|100.00%
!align="right"|

|-

| style="width: 130px" |Independent
|David John Sykes
|align="right"|1,595
|align="right"|44.38%
|align="right"|–

|Labour
|Allan McCallum
|align="right"|489
|align="right"|13.61%
|align="right"|–
|- bgcolor="white"
!align="left" colspan=3|Total
!align="right"|3,594
!align="right"|100.00%
!align="right"|

|-

| style="width: 130px" |Independent
|David John Sykes
|align="right"|Acclaimed
|align="right"|100.00%
|- bgcolor="white"
!align="left" colspan=3|Total
!align="right"|Acclamation
!align="right"|

|-

 
|Conservative
|Frank G. Forster
|align="right"|565
|align="right"|42.39%
|align="right"|+5.94
|- bgcolor="white"
!align="left" colspan=3|Total
!align="right"|1,333
!align="right"|100.00%
!align="right"|

|-

 
|Provincial Rights
|William Oswald Smyth
|align="right"|401
|align="right"|36.45%
|align="right"|–
|- bgcolor="white"
!align="left" colspan=3|Total
!align="right"|1,100
!align="right"|100.00%
!align="right"|

References

External links 
Website of the Legislative Assembly of Saskatchewan
Saskatchewan Archives Board – Saskatchewan Election Results By Electoral Division

Saskatchewan provincial electoral districts
Swift Current